The Museo Egizio is a museum sited in the Sforza Castle of Milan, Italy.  The Castle is one of the most famous monuments in Milan and is home to several museums including the Egyptian Section of the Milan Archaeological Museum, the Museum of Ancient Art, the Pinacoteca and the Museum of Musical Instruments.

The Egyptian Museum, situated in the underground level of the ducal courtyard, is divided into seven different sections:

 ABOUT ANCIENT EGYPTIAN WRITING
 ABOUT PHARAOHS
 ABOUT DEITIES AND CULTS
 ABOUT EVERYDAY LIFE FOR THE EGYPTIANS
 ABOUT FUNERARY CULT
 EXCAVATIONS CONDUCTED BY ACHILLE VOGLIANO
 MUMMIES, SARCOPHAGI AND FUNERARY MASKS

A mummy dating from the Greco-Roman period, from Thebes, and ancient Egyptian sarcophagi are exposed in the "mummies, sarcophagi and funerary mask" section, while some papyri of the Book of the Dead are exposed in the Funerary Cult section.

Gallery

See also
 List of museums of Egyptian antiquities

References
https://web.archive.org/web/20120702005129/http://www.milanocastello.it/ing/visitaSotterraneoEgizia.html
Le città d'arte:Milano, Guide brevi Skira, ed.2008, eutori vari
Milano e provincia, Touring Club Italiano ed.2003, autori vari

Further reading

Museums in Milan
Egyptological collections in Italy
Archaeological museums in Italy
Sforza Castle
Tourist attractions in Milan